The Panasonic Lumix G Vario 45-200mm 4.0-f/5.6 MEGA O.I.S lens is a compact telephoto zoom lens for Micro Four Thirds system cameras. It is a varifocal lens.

It was released in 2008, as one of the first Micro Four Thirds lenses, along with the Lumix G 14-45mm lens and the Lumix G1 camera.

A mark II version of the lens was released in 2017. This has the improved POWER O.I.S. image stabilization, as well as Dual I.S. which can combine with in-body image stabilization. It also has faster autofocus, and is splash/dust proof.

External links
 LUMIX G VARIO 45-200mm / F4.0-5.6 / MEGA O.I.S.

References

045-200
Camera lenses introduced in 2008